Magyar Testgyakorlók Köre Budapest Futball Club is a professional football club based in Budapest, Hungary.

Managers
  Sándor Kertész (1903–07)
  Hugó Szüsz (1907–11)
  John Tait Robertson (1911–13)
  Jimmy Hogan (1 July 1914 – 30 June 1921)
  Herbert Burgess (1921–22)
  Antal Frontz (1922–25)
  Jimmy Hogan (1 December 1925 – 30 June 1927)
  Gyula Feldmann (1926–28)
  Béla Révész (1928–29)
  Billy Hibbert (1930–31)
  Imre Senkey (1931–35)
  Alfréd Schaffer (1 July 1933 – 30 June 1934), (1 July 1935 – 30 June 1937)
  József Braun (1937–39)
  Gyula Feldmann (1939–40)
  Zoltán Vágó (1945)
  Károly Csapkay (1946)
  Zoltán Vágó (1946)
  Pál Titkos (1946–47)
  Márton Bukovi (1947–54)
  Tibor Kemeny (1 January 1955 – 31 December 1955)
  Béla Volentik (1956–57)
  Márton Bukovi (1957–59)
  Nándor Hidegkuti (1959–60)
  Gyula Szűcs (1 January 1960 – 30 June 1962)
  Imre Kovács (1962–64)
  Béla Volentik (1964)
  Károly Lakat (1965–66)
  Nándor Hidegkuti (1967–68)
  Ferenc Kovács (1968–69)
  Tibor Palicskó (1970–72)
  János Bencsik (1972)
  Géza Kalocsay (1 July 1972 – 30 June 1974)
  Imre Kovács (1974–75)
  Mihály Keszthelyi (1975–77)
  György Mezey (1977–80)
  Antal Szentmihályi (1980)
  László Szarvas (1980–81)
  László Sárosi (1982–83)
  Tibor Palicskó (1983–84)
  György Makay (1984–85)
  József Both (1985–86)
  József Verebes (1986–92)
  Imre Gellei (1992–93)
  Sándor Popovics (1993–94)
  Bertalan Bicskei (1995–96)
  István Kisteleki (1995–96)
  Imre Garaba (1996–97)
  József Garami (1 July 1996 – 30 June 1998)
  Sándor Egervári (1 July 1998 – 30 June 1999)
  Henk ten Cate (1 July 1999 – 30 June 2000)
  Gábor Pölöskei (1 July 2000 – 30 June 2001)
  György Bognár (2 May 2001 – 24 April 2002)
  Sándor Egervári (1 July 2002 – 30 June 2004)
  József Garami (1 July, 2004–15)
  Csaba László (2015–2016)
  Vaszilisz Teodoru (2016–20 December 2016)
  Zsolt Tamási (20.12.2016–2017)
  Tamás Feczkó (9 June 2017–10 March 2019)
  Tamás Lucsánszky (11 March 2019 – 30 May 2019)
  Michael Boris (30 May 2019 – present)
 Giovanni Costantino
 Vaszilisz Teodoru
 Gábor Márton

References

External links